Iason Sappas (1892, date of death unknown) was a Greek sport shooter who competed in the 1920 Summer Olympics.

In the 1920 Summer Olympics he won the silver medal as member of the Greek team in the team 30 metre military pistol event.

He also participated in the following events:

 Team 50 metre free pistol - fourth place
 50 metre free pistol - eighth place
 Team free rifle - 13th place
 300 metre free rifle, three positions - result unknown

References

External links
profile (name misspelt)

1892 births
Greek male sport shooters
ISSF pistol shooters
ISSF rifle shooters
Olympic shooters of Greece
Shooters at the 1920 Summer Olympics
Olympic silver medalists for Greece
Year of death unknown
Olympic medalists in shooting
Medalists at the 1920 Summer Olympics